Government Degree College, Teliamura, established in 2012, is a college in Khowai district, Tripura. It offers undergraduate courses in arts and sciences. It is affiliated to  Tripura University.

Departments

Arts and Commerce
The college offers the following subjects:
English
Sanskrit
Kokborok
History
Geography
Political Science
Philosophy
Education
Information Technology

Accreditation
The college is recognized by the University Grants Commission (UGC).

See also
Teliamura
Education in India
Education in Tripura
Tripura University
Literacy in India
List of institutions of higher education in Tripura

References

External links

Colleges affiliated to Tripura University
Educational institutions established in 2012
Universities and colleges in Tripura
2012 establishments in Tripura
Colleges in Tripura